Events from the year 1884 in Japan.

Incumbents
Emperor: Emperor Meiji
Empress consort: Empress Shōken

Governors
Aichi Prefecture: Renpei Kunisada
Akita Prefecture: Akagawa
Aomori Prefecture: Kyusei Fukushima
Ehime Prefecture: Shinpei Seki
Fukui Prefecture: Tsutomu Ishiguro
Fukushima Prefecture: Michitsume Mishima
Gifu Prefecture: Toshi Kozaki
Gunma Prefecture: Katori Yoshihiko 
Hiroshima Prefecture: Senda Sadaaki
Ibaraki Prefecture: Hitomi Katsutaro 
Iwate Prefecture: Korekiyo Shima then Shoichiro Ishii
Kanagawa Prefecture: Baron Tadatsu Hayashi
Kochi Prefecture: Yoshiaki Tonabe
Kumamoto Prefecture: Yoshiaki Tonabe
Kyoto Prefecture: Baron Utsumi Tadakatsu
Mie Prefecture: Sadamedaka Iwamura then Baron Utsumi Tadakatsu 
Miyagi Prefecture: Matsudaira Masanao
Miyazaki Prefecture: Teru Tananbe 
Nagano Prefecture: Makoto Ono then Baron Seiichiro Kinashi
Niigata Prefecture: Nagayama Sheng Hui 
Oita Prefecture: Ryokichi Nishimura
Osaka Prefecture: Tateno Tsuyoshi
Saga Prefecture: Kamata
Saitama Prefecture: Kiyohide Yoshida
Shimane Prefecture: Tamechika Fujikawa 
Tochigi Prefecture: Mishi Michitsune
Tokyo: Earl Kensho Yoshikawa  
Toyama Prefecture: Kunishige Masafuni
Yamagata Prefecture: Orita Hirauchi

Events
November - Chichibu Incident
Unknown date – Yamada Electronic Wire Manufacturing, as predecessor of Furukawa Electronic Work has founded.

Births
January 1 - Chikuhei Nakajima (d. 1949), naval officer, engineer, and politician, founded Nakajima Aircraft Company
January 4 - Gyosaku Morozumi, (d. 1963), general in the Imperial Japanese Army
January 14 - Tetsuzan Nagata, (d. 1935), general in the Imperial Japanese Army
February 22 - Tamaki Miura (d. 1946), operatic soprano
April 4 - Isoroku Yamamoto (d. 1943), Marshal Admiral of the Navy and the commander-in-chief of the Combined Fleet during World War II
December 30 - Hideki Tojo (d. 1948), leader of the Imperial Rule Assistance Association and the 40th Prime Minister of Japan

Deaths

 Oura Okei (b. 1828), businesswoman

References

 
1880s in Japan
Years of the 19th century in Japan